The ninth edition of the Gent–Wevelgem's women's race was held on Sunday 11 October 2020, rescheduled from the original date of 29 March 2020 due to the COVID-19 pandemic. In the rescheduled season, it was the eight event of the 2020 UCI Women's World Tour.

Route
Due to the COVID-19 pandemic in Belgium, the race organisers had asked spectators to follow the race from home and had not released any information on the course to the public before the race started. The start times of the races were also adapted to avoid a clash with the 2020 Giro d'Italia. For the first time, the men's race started before the women's race.

Teams
Eight UCI Women's WorldTeams and sixteen UCI Women's Continental Teams were to compete in the race. However, due to a positive covid-19 test in the team,  decided to pull out of the race. 

UCI Women's WorldTeams

 
 
 
 
 
 
 

UCI Women's Continental Teams

Results

See also
 2020 in women's road cycling

References

Gent-Wevelgem
Gent-Wevelgem
Gent–Wevelgem
Gent-Wevelgem (women's race)